The Cascade Canyon Trail is a  round-trip long hiking trail in Grand Teton National Park in the U.S. state of Wyoming.

Description 
The trailhead is at the South Jenny Lake parking area and follows the Jenny Lake Trail around the south shore of Jenny Lake to the Forks of Cascade Canyon. The trail passes near Hidden Falls after almost  then goes west into the heart of Cascade Canyon, flanked by Teewinot Mountain and Mount Owen to the south and The Jaw and Rock of Ages to the north. At the Forks of Cascade Canyon, the trail splits with the Lake Solitude Trail heading to Lake Solitude and Paintbrush Divide, while the South Fork Cascade Canyon Trail leads to Hurricane Pass. There are no camping areas along the trail though not far from the Forks, camping zones exist to the north and south.

See also
 List of hiking trails in Grand Teton National Park

References

Hiking trails of Grand Teton National Park